Tameside Metropolitan Borough Council elections are generally held three years out of every four, with a third of the council being elected each time. Tameside Metropolitan Borough Council is the local authority for the metropolitan borough of Tameside in Greater Manchester, England. Since the last boundary changes in 2004, 57 councillors have been elected from 19 wards. New ward boundaries have been prepared to take effect from the 2023 election.

Political control
Tameside was created under the Local Government Act 1972 as a metropolitan borough, with Greater Manchester County Council providing county-level services. The first election to the council was held in 1973, initially operating as a shadow authority before coming into its powers on 1 April 1974. Greater Manchester County Council was abolished in 1986 and Tameside became a unitary authority. Political control of the council since 1973 has been held by the following parties:

Leadership
The leaders of the council since 1974 have been:

Council elections
1998 Tameside Metropolitan Borough Council election
1999 Tameside Metropolitan Borough Council election
2000 Tameside Metropolitan Borough Council election
2002 Tameside Metropolitan Borough Council election
2003 Tameside Metropolitan Borough Council election
2004 Tameside Metropolitan Borough Council election (whole Metropolitan Borough Council elected after boundary changes)
2006 Tameside Metropolitan Borough Council election
2007 Tameside Metropolitan Borough Council election
2008 Tameside Metropolitan Borough Council election
2010 Tameside Metropolitan Borough Council election
2011 Tameside Metropolitan Borough Council election
2012 Tameside Metropolitan Borough Council election
2014 Tameside Metropolitan Borough Council election
2015 Tameside Metropolitan Borough Council election
2016 Tameside Metropolitan Borough Council election
2018 Tameside Metropolitan Borough Council election
2019 Tameside Metropolitan Borough Council election
2020 Tameside Metropolitan Borough Council election

By-election results

References

By-election results

External links
Tameside Council

 
Council elections in Greater Manchester
Local government in Tameside
Elections in Tameside
Metropolitan borough council elections in England